"Don't You Ever Get Tired (Of Hurting Me)" is a country song written by Hank Cochran that was a hit single for Ray Price in 1965, reaching No. 11 on the Billboard chart. A later version by Ronnie Milsap in 1989 was Milsap's thirty-third number one single as a solo artist.  The single went to number one for one week and spent a total of thirteen weeks on the chart.  Other notable recordings of the song were done by Jack Greene and George Jones and by Price and Willie Nelson as a duet.

Chart performance

Ray Price

Connie Cato

Willie Nelson & Ray Price

Ronnie Milsap

Year-end charts

References

1965 songs
1965 singles
1977 singles
1980 singles
1988 singles
Ray Price (musician) songs
Willie Nelson songs
Ronnie Milsap songs
Songs written by Hank Cochran
Song recordings produced by Tom Collins (record producer)
RCA Records singles